Convoy SC 121 was the 121st of the numbered series of World War II Slow Convoys of merchant ships from Sydney, Cape Breton Island to Liverpool. Three of the escorts had defective sonar and three had unserviceable radar.

Background
As western Atlantic coastal convoys brought an end to the second happy time, Admiral Karl Dönitz, the Befehlshaber der U-Boote (BdU) or commander in chief of U-Boats, shifted focus to the mid-Atlantic to avoid aircraft patrols. Although convoy routing was less predictable in the mid-ocean, Dönitz anticipated that the increased numbers of U-boats being produced would be able to find convoys with the advantage of intelligence gained through B-Dienst decryption of British Naval Cypher Number 3. Only 20 percent of the 180 trans-Atlantic convoys, from the end of July 1942 until the end of April 1943, lost ships to U-boat attack.

Battle
On 6 March  sighted the convoy, which had been scattered by nine consecutive days of northwesterly Force 10 gales and snow squalls. The storm damaged the radio communication system aboard the escort commander's ship Spencer and Dauphin had to leave the convoy with damaged steering gear.  torpedoed the British freighter Egyptian on the night of 6–7 March.

 torpedoed straggling Swedish freighter Milos on the evening of 9 March. That night U-405 torpedoed the Norwegian freighter Bonneville while  torpedoed the British freighter  and  torpedoed the British escort oiler Rosewood and American ammunition ship Malantic.

The Flower-class corvettes  and  reinforced the convoy escort on 10 March, and the convoy reached Liverpool on 14 March. Only 76 of the 275 crewmen of the sunken ships were rescued.

Ships in convoy

See also
 Convoy Battles of World War II

Sources

References

SC121
Naval battles of World War II involving Canada
C
Naval battles of World War II involving Germany